5 Fingers, known also as Five Fingers, is a 1952 American spy film directed by Joseph L. Mankiewicz and produced by Otto Lang. The screenplay written by Michael Wilson was based on the 1950 book Operation Cicero (original German: Der Fall Cicero) by Ludwig Carl Moyzisch, Nazi commercial attaché at the German embassy in Ankara, Turkey (1943–44).

The film is based on the true story of Albanian-born Elyesa Bazna, a spy with the code name of Cicero who worked for the Nazis in 1943–44 while he was employed as valet to the British ambassador to Turkey, Sir Hughe Montgomery Knatchbull-Hugessen. Bazna would photograph top-secret documents and deliver the pictures to Franz von Papen, the German ambassador in Turkey and a former German chancellor, using Moyzisch as the intermediary.

James Mason plays Ulysses Diello (Cicero), the character based on Bazna. The film also stars Danielle Darrieux, Michael Rennie, Herbert Berghof and Walter Hampden.

Plot
In neutral Turkey in 1944, German ambassador Franz von Papen meets countess Anna Staviska, a Frenchwoman and the widow of a pro-German Polish count. Now destitute, the countess volunteers to become a spy for a fee, but her offer is declined.

Ulysses Diello approaches the German embassy attaché Moyzisch, offering to provide von Papen with top-secret British documents for a price of £20,000. The Germans do not know that Diello is the personal valet to British ambassador Sir Frederic Taylor as well as the former valet of the late count.

The photographed documents taken from Sir Frederic's safe prove to be genuine. Diello is given the code name Cicero and asked to continue his subterfuge. He gives his money to Anna for safekeeping and pays her a portion of it, provided that he is allowed to use her new villa as a meeting place for his transactions. When the valet also tells Anna of his dream of living in South America with her, she slaps his face but agrees to his conditions.

Moyzisch is summoned to Berlin by SS general Kaltenbrunner, suspicious of Cicero's true intent. Allied bombing of a Romanian oil refinery is executed, exactly as Cicero's photographed documents had outlined. Colonel von Richter is sent to Ankara to take command of the negotiations with Cicero, while the British send counterintelligence man Colin Travers to identify the spy.

Anna's newly found wealth and previous willingness to become a spy cause her to fall under suspicion by Travers, who also rigs the ambassador's safe with a burglar alarm. Von Richter requests a document detailing an Allied operation called Overlord, the D-Day invasion plan, and Cicero demands £40,000 for it.

Diello realizes that he could soon be killed by one side or captured by the other. He flees to South America, only to discover that Anna has stolen all of his money and departed to Switzerland. She sends a letter to Sir Frederic that identifies his valet as the spy being paid by the Germans. Diello removes the fuse for the safe's alarm, opens the safe, photographs the D-Day plans and intercepts the letter, but a cleaning woman replaces the fuse; when Diello returns the plans to the safe, he triggers the alarm and must flee.

Diello now knows for certain how Anna feels about him. Broke and on the run, Diello demands and receives a £100,000 payment from the Germans for the photographs of the D-Day plans. A second malicious letter from Anna to the Germans misinforms them that the valet is a British spy, causing them to disregard the D-Day information as unreliable.

Diello escapes alone to Rio, where he enjoys a new life of prosperity and freedom until Brazilian authorities arrest him because all of his money is counterfeit, created during Operation Bernhard. Realizing that Anna's money in Switzerland is also counterfeit offers him some consolation.

Cast

 James Mason as Ulysses Diello / Cicero (Elyesa Bazna)
 Danielle Darrieux as Countess Anna Staviska
 Michael Rennie as Colin Travers
 Walter Hampden as Sir Frederic Taylor
 Oskar Karlweis as Moyzisch
 Herbert Berghof as Colonel von Richter
 John Wengraf as Count Franz von Papen
 Ben Astar as Siebert
 Roger Plowden as McFadden
 Ivan Triesault as	Steuben (uncredited)
 Lumsden Hare as MP (uncredited)
 John Sutton as Narrator (uncredited)

Reception

Critical Response 
On Rotten Tomatoes the film has an approval rating of 100% based on reviews from 7 critics. Critics lauded Otto Lang's emphasis on realism and authenticity, praising the film's use of location shooting in Berlin, Ankara, London, and Istanbul which "befits its avowedly authentic subject matter." Boxoffice went so far as to call the film a "semi-documentary" though Variety and The Hollywood Reporter simply saw the mix of location photography with studio material to be an excellent background device in a film which took "necessary dramatic license." William Brogdan of Variety criticized the film's length calling it "a good if somewhat overlong cloak-and-dagger thriller." Boxoffice corroborated Brogdan's viewpoint calling 5 Fingers "a trifle too long." Picturegoer called the film "gripping" and predicted it would lift James Mason's career into a higher level of stardom: "The story gets off to a slow start, but once Jimmy Mason arrives, he puts an end to all that...Hollywood has a new star."

Awards 
The film was nominated for two Academy Awards: Best Director for Mankiewicz and Best Screenplay for Wilson. Mankiewicz was also nominated for Outstanding Directorial Achievement in Motion Pictures by the Directors Guild of America and Wilson was nominated for Best Written American Drama by the Writers Guild of America. He won the Golden Globe for Best Screenplay and the Edgar Award for Best Mystery Screenplay.

Television adaptation
Five Fingers was adapted into a 1959–1960 16-episode TV series starring David Hedison and Luciana Paluzzi.

References

 Bazna published his own account of the events in his book, I Was Cicero, in 1962 (Bazna, Elyesa, with Hans Nogly. I Was Cicero. New York: Harper & Row, 1962)

External links

 
 
 
 

1952 films
1950s spy drama films
20th Century Fox films
American spy drama films
American black-and-white films
Edgar Award-winning works
1950s English-language films
Films scored by Bernard Herrmann
Films based on biographies
Films directed by Joseph L. Mankiewicz
Films set in 1944
Films set in Istanbul
Films set in Ankara
Films set in London
Films shot in Istanbul
Films shot in London
World War II spy films
Films with screenplays by Michael Wilson (writer)
Films with screenplays by Joseph L. Mankiewicz
1952 drama films
Cultural depictions of Franz von Papen
1950s American films